The 2019 Syracuse Orange men's soccer team represented Syracuse University during the 2019 NCAA Division I men's soccer season. It was the program's 96th season and 7th in the Atlantic Coast Conference.  The Orange were led by Ian McIntyre, is in his tenth year.

Background

The 2018 Syracuse men's soccer team finished the season with a 7–7–4 overall record and a 1–4–3 ACC record.  The Orange were seeded tenth–overall in the 2018 ACC Men's Soccer Tournament, where they lost to Virginia Tech in the first round.  The Orange earned an at-large bid to the 2018 NCAA Division I Men's Soccer Tournament.  As the sixteenth overall seed in the tournament, the Orange lost to eventual runners up Akron in their first match of the tournament.

At the end of the 2018 season, two Orange men's soccer players wer selected in the 2019 MLS SuperDraft: Tajon Buchanan and Kamal Miller.

Player movement

Players leaving

Players arriving

Squad

Roster 

Updated: August 19, 2019

Team management

Source:

Schedule 
Source: 

|-
!colspan=6 style=""| Exhibition
|-

|-
!colspan=6 style=""| Regular season
|-

|-
!colspan=6 style=""| ACC Tournament

|-
!colspan=6 style=""| NCAA Tournament

Awards and honors

Rankings

2020 MLS Super Draft

Source:

References 

2019
Syracuse Orange
Syracuse Orange
Syracuse Orange men's soccer
Syracuse Orange